John Elliot Griffis (January 28, 1893 – 1967) was an American composer.

Born in Boston, the son of the noted Orientalist William Elliot Griffis, he attended public schools in Ithaca, New York, as well as The Manlius School before going to Ithaca College. He went to Yale University to work with Horatio Parker from 1913 until 1915, and studied at the New England Conservatory of Music with Daniel Gregory Mason, Harry Newton Redman, and George Whitefield Chadwick before serving in the United States Army. He taught at Grinnell College, the Westchester Conservatory of Music and the St. Louis Conservatory of Music before settling in Los Angeles. Much of his output was chamber music, especially piano pieces and songs; he did, however, compose some works for orchestra and one opera, 1963's The Port of Pleasure. He died in 1967 and is buried at Vale Cemetery in Schenectady, New York.

References

Griffis's papers at the University of Texas at Austin

American male composers
American classical pianists
American male classical pianists
Ithaca College alumni
Yale University alumni
New England Conservatory alumni
Grinnell College faculty
1893 births
1968 deaths
Pupils of George Whitefield Chadwick
Pupils of Horatio Parker
20th-century American composers
20th-century classical pianists
Manlius Pebble Hill School alumni
20th-century American pianists
20th-century American male musicians